Louis Alexandre Henri Joseph Piré (1827–1887) was a Belgian botanist. He held the position of Professor of Botany at the Université Libre de Bruxelles.

Works
 Flore analytique du centre de la Belgique (with Félix Muller)    (Victor Devaux et Cie, Bruxelles,1866)
 Revue des mousses acrocarpes de la flore belge (C Annoot-Braeckman, Gand, 1869)
 Opuscules de botanique. II: Notice sur l'Alsine pallida Dmtr. (Bulletins de la Société royale de botanique de Belgique, tome II, n. 1)
 Opuscules de botanique. III: Deuxième herborisation de la Société royale de botanique de Belgique (Bulletins de la Société royale de botanique de Belgique, tome II, n. 3, Juin 1863)
 Opuscules de botanique. IV: Troisième herborisation de la Société royale de botanique de Belgique (Bulletins de la Société royale de botanique de Belgique, tome III, n. 3, Juillet 1864)
 Biographie de Charles Linné, a biography of Carl Von Linné, 1872

References

1827 births
1887 deaths
19th-century Belgian botanists